Tyazhely Sputnik (meaning Heavy Satellite), also known by its development name as Venera 1VA No. 1, and in the West as Sputnik 7, was a Soviet spacecraft, which was intended to be the first spacecraft to explore Venus. Due to a problem with its upper stage it failed to leave low Earth orbit. In order to avoid acknowledging the failure, the Soviet government instead announced that the entire spacecraft, including the upper stage, was a test of a "Heavy Satellite" which would serve as a launch platform for future missions. This resulted in the upper stage being considered a separate spacecraft, from which the probe was "launched", on several subsequent missions.

Tyazhely Sputnik was launched at 01:18:03 UTC on 4 February 1961, atop a Molniya 8K78 carrier rocket flying from Site 1/5 at the Baikonur Cosmodrome. When the upper stage ignited, cavitation in the liquid oxygen flowing through the oxidiser pump caused the pump to fail, resulting in an engine failure 0.8 second after ignition. It reentered the atmosphere over Siberia on 26 February 1961.

According to the memoirs of Boris Chertok, "A pendant shaped like a small globe with the continents etched on it was placed on the 1VA. Inside this small sphere was a medal depicting the Earth-to-Venus flight path. On the other side of the medal was the emblem of the Soviet Union. The pendant was placed in a spherical capsule with thermal shielding to protect it during entry into Venus' atmosphere at reentry velocity." In what he refers to as a "Strange but True [incident]... in the history of cosmonautics", while the spacecraft was originally thought to have re-entered over the Pacific Ocean, it was subsequently (in 1963) found to have re-entered over Siberia, when this medal made its way back to Chertok by way of his boss, Chief Rocket Designer Sergei Korolev. He relates that "while swimming in a river – a tributary of the Biryusa River in eastern Siberia – a local boy hurt his foot on some sort of piece of iron. When he retrieved it from the water, rather than throw it into deeper water, he brought it home and showed it to his father. The boy’s father, curious as to what the dented metal sphere contained, opened it up and discovered this medal inside… The boy’s father brought his find to the police. The local police delivered the remains of the pendant to the regional department of the KGB, which in turn forwarded it to Moscow. In Moscow the appropriate KGB directorate… after notifying Keldysh as president of the Academy of Sciences", delivered the pendant to Korolev. "Thus, [Chertok] was awarded the medal that had been certified for the flight to Venus by the protocol that [he and Korolev] signed in January 1961. After the launch we were all certain that the Tyazhelyy sputnik and the pendant had sunk in the ocean. Now it turned out that it had burned up over Siberia. The pendant had been designed to withstand Venus' atmosphere and therefore it reached the Earth’s surface."

The sister probe, Venera 1, successfully launched and was injected into a heliocentric orbit toward Venus one week later, although telemetry on the mission failed a week into flight.

See also

 List of missions to Venus
 Venera

References

1961 in the Soviet Union
Spacecraft launched in 1961
Venera program
Spacecraft which reentered in 1961
1MV